Richard James Milgram (born 5 December 1939 in South Bend, Indiana) is an American mathematician, specializing in algebraic topology. He is the son of  mathematician Arthur Milgram.

Biography
Milgram graduated from the University of Chicago with a bachelor's degree and a master's degree in 1961. He received his doctorate in 1964 from the University of Minnesota with thesis The homology ring of symmetric products of Moore spaces under the supervision of Alfred Aeppli (1928–2008). Milgram taught from 1970 as a professor at Stanford University, where he is now emeritus. He was a visiting professor at the University of Lille (2001), the Chinese Academy of Sciences (2000) in Beijing, at the University of Göttingen (1987 as Gauss Professor), and at the University of Minnesota (1986 as Ordway Professor), as well as the ETH Zurich, Edinburgh, Montreal, Barcelona, the MSRI, and the University of New Mexico.

In 1974, Milgram was an Invited Speaker with talk The structure of the oriented topological and piecewise linear bordism rings at the International Congress of Mathematicians in Vancouver. He was an editor for the Pacific Journal of Mathematics from 1973 to 1983, for the Duke Mathematical Journal from 1976 to 1984, and for the A.M.S. Contemporary Mathematics series (from its inception in 1980 to 1984). In August 1999 Stanford University held a mathematical conference in his honor.

His doctoral students include Gunnar Carlsson.

Research
With Charles P. Boyer, Jacques Hurtubise, and Benjamin M. Mann, he proved in 1992 the Atiyah–Jones conjecture on the topology of the moduli space of instantons on spheres. He has also done research on robotics and protein folding.

Mathematics education

In addition to algebraic and geometric topology, he has written on mathematics education and served on numerous committees, including the National Board for Education Sciences (since 2005). He is one of the major authors of the mathematical standards for schools in California and has advised the school authorities in Michigan, New York, and Georgia.

Selected publications

See also
List of Jewish American mathematicians

References

External links

20th-century American mathematicians
21st-century American mathematicians
Topologists
Academic journal editors
Mathematics educators
Mathematics education in the United States
Mathematicians from California
Jewish American scientists
Stanford University faculty
University of Chicago alumni
University of Minnesota alumni
Mathematicians from Indiana
Writers from South Bend, Indiana
20th-century American male writers
21st-century American male writers
1939 births
Living people
21st-century American Jews